Naresuan University (NU) is a government university in Phitsanulok Province, northern Thailand. It was established as a separate university on 29 July 1990, the 400th anniversary of the start of the reign of Phitsanulok-born King Naresuan the Great. A courtyard with a statue of King Naresuan is on the campus grounds and students regularly pay their respects before it. The university has about 20,000 full-time students.

History
On 18 January 1964, the Ministry of Education resolved to create branches of the Bangkok's College of Education in each region of the country. On 25 January 1967, the Phitsanulok campus was established as the fourth branch of the College of Education and was meant to serve mainly the northern provinces.

In 1974 the College of Education was upgraded to university status and was named Srinakharinwirot University. Originally, only the third and fourth years of university study were offered at Phitsanulok, and students were admitted by competitive examination after completing the curriculum at one of the nation's associate degree level teacher training colleges. In 1976, the first and second years were added. Other majors besides education were gradually included, and in 1990 the Phitsanulok campus became independent of Srinakarinwirot University. It was designated "Naresuan University" during the celebrations of the 400th anniversary of King Naresuan the Great's ascension to the throne.

Naresuan University has a second campus in Phayao, which opened in 1999 and was upgraded to university level and named "University of Phayao" in 2010. It also offers extension courses across the country at nine education centers, including Bangkok.

Ranking
In September 2006, Naresuan University was ranked as "Very Good" in a study conducted on Thai universities by the Commission on Higher Education and 5th in the uniRank 2017 Thai University Ranking.

Faculties
The university has 16 faculties, organized into three clusters:

 The Health Sciences Cluster
  Faculty of Allied Health Sciences
  Faculty of Dentistry 
  Faculty of Medical Science
  Faculty of Medicine
 Naresuan University Hospital
  Faculty of Nursing
  Faculty of Pharmaceutical Sciences
  Faculty of Public Health
 The Social Sciences Cluster
  Faculty of Education
  Faculty of Humanities
  Faculty of Law
  Faculty of Business Economics and Communications
  Faculty of Social Sciences
 The Science & Technology Cluster
  Faculty of Agriculture, Natural Resources & Environment
  Faculty of Architecture
  Faculty of Engineering
  Faculty of Science

  Faculty of Logistics and Digital Supply Chain

Other schools, colleges and institutes organized by Naresuan University:
  School of Renewable Energy Technology (SERT)
  Naresuan University International College (NUIC)
  Graduate School
  Naresuan Institute for Community Empowerment (NICE)
  Institute of Research and Development Administration (IRDA)
 Center of ASEAN Community Studies (CACS)

Naresuan University Art and Culture Gallery
The Naresuan University Art and Culture Gallery holds over 100 artistic works by culturally significant Thai artists.

Partner Institution

Malaysia
Universiti Tunku Abdul Rahman

Philippines
 San Sebastian College - Recoletos

See also
 Naresuan University Hospital
 Education in Thailand

References

External links

 Naresuan University website

 
Universities in Thailand
Phitsanulok
Buildings and structures in Phitsanulok province
Educational institutions established in 1990
1990 establishments in Thailand